Affine  is a provider of high-end analytics services to solve complex business problems. Affine has approximately 450+ employees across India, US, APAC, with offices in Bellevue, WA; New York, NY; Duluth, GA; San Mateo, CA; Santa Monica, CA - United States.

Company 
Affine was founded in 2011 by Manas Agrawal, Vineet Kumar and Abhishek Anand.

In 2012, Affine opened its first overseas office in New Jersey, United States and later moved to SF, Bay Area, California where the company is currently headquartered. It also expanded its operations in Fremont, NewYork and Bellevue, Washington.

Affine is a strategic analytics partner to Fortune 500 companies. It has been cited by Gartner as “Specialist Mid-Sized Vendor in Advanced Analytics and Machine Learning”. The firm provides services in the area of Predictive Analytics, Artificial Intelligence, Big Data and Machine Learning. Affine focuses on verticals like Retail, CPG, Ecommerce, Banking and Financial Services, Technology.

Awards and recognitions 
 CIO Review Magazine covers Affine as an analytics specialist that serves big data with a difference
 Affine cited by Gartner as a Specialist Midsize Consultancy for Analytics and Machine Learning Solutions and Services in the latest Gartner report on Machine Learning.
 Affine won the Flipkart Gridlock Hackathon, which was organized by Flipkart at Bengaluru.

References

External links
Official Website

Analytics companies
Companies established in 2011